Joseph Schubert may refer to:

 Joseph Schubert (composer) (1754–1837), German composer, violinist and violist
 Joseph C. Schubert (1871–1959), mayor of Madison, Wisconsin
 Joseph Schubert (bishop) (1890–1969), Romanian cleric and Roman Catholic bishop
 Joseph Schubert (politician) (1889–1952), Canadian politician